Ziegelbrücke railway station is a junction station in the village of Ziegelbrücke in Switzerland. Whilst the village is shared between the municipality of Glarus Nord, in the canton of Glarus, and the municipality of Schänis, in the canton of St. Gallen, the station is located in the Gemarkung of Schänis, where it is the larger of two railway stations (the other being Schänis railway station).

Opened in 1875, the station is owned and operated by the Swiss Federal Railways. It is one of the southern termini of the Lake Zurich left bank railway line, a main line that links Zürich Hauptbahnhof with Ziegelbrücke and Näfels.  From Ziegelbrücke, the main line continues, as the Ziegelbrücke–Sargans railway, towards its ultimate destination, Chur.

Ziegelbrücke is also a terminus for two regional lines, the Ziegelbrücke–Linthal railway and the Rapperswil–Ziegelbrücke railway.

Facilities
The station features two station buildings, a goods despatch office and a maintenance depot. Tracks 1 - 4 are used for goods traffic, shunting operation and to accommodate passenger trains during off-peak hours and overnight. Tracks 5 - 10 are equipped with passenger platforms and therefore used for passenger traffic. Tracks 6 and 9 are usually used for intercity- and freight-trains that pass through the station at maximum speed. Tracks 11 and 12 are solely used for shunting operation and to accommodate passenger trains during off-peak hours and overnight.

On the south side of the station, parallel to the railway line, lies the river Linth, a railway power line and the main road.

Services 
The station is served by an hourly InterRegio (IR35, Aare Linth) service between Bern and Chur, stopping at Zurich, Thalwil, Pfaffikon SZ, Ziegelbrücke, Sargans and Landquart. International trains, such as the ÖBB Railjet Zürich HB–Wien Hauptbahnhof or the DB ICE Hamburg-Altona–Chur, do not stopp at Ziegelbrücke.

Two lines of the Zürich S-Bahn also connect Zürich and Ziegelbrücke, combining to provide three trains per hour. The S2 terminates at Ziegelbrücke and runs twice per hour; with some weekend trains continuing to Unterterzen. The hourly S25 continues through the canton of Glarus to Linthal.

Two lines of the St. Gallen S-Bahn also provide service to Ziegelbrücke, both running once an hour. The S4 operates in both directions around a loop via Uznach, St. Gallen and Sargans back to Ziegelbrücke (Alpstein circle route, Alpsteinrundfahrt). The S6 links Rapperswil with Schwanden (or Linthal during off-peak hours) via Uznach and Ziegelbrücke. In combination with the Voralpen Express (running hourly between –Rapperswil–Uznach–St. Gallen), the S4 and S6 provide half-hourly services to both Rapperswil and St. Gallen through connecting services at Uznach railway station.

This service is designated S27 but is not part of either S-Bahn network.

Summary:

Bus traffic 
Postauto and local Autobetrieb Weesen-Amden bus lines connect Ziegelbrücke with the communities in the Wahlkreis See-Gaster and the municipalities of Bilten and Niederurnen.

See also

History of rail transport in Switzerland
Rail transport in Switzerland

References

External links
 
 

Railway stations in the canton of St. Gallen
Swiss Federal Railways stations
Railway stations in Switzerland opened in 1875